The year 1952 in science and technology involved some significant events, listed below.

Biology
 August 1 – Around 9 o'clock AM Pacific Time Zone, the San Benedicto rock wren goes extinct as its island home is smothered in a massive volcanic eruption.
 August 14 – Alan Turing's paper "The Chemical Basis of Morphogenesis" is published, putting forward a reaction–diffusion hypothesis of pattern formation, considered a seminal piece of work in morphogenesis.
 August 28 – Alan Hodgkin and Andrew Huxley publish the Hodgkin–Huxley model of action potentials in neurons of the squid giant axon.
 September 20 – Publication of the paper on the Hershey–Chase experiment showing conclusively that DNA, not protein, is the genetic material of bacteriophages.
 October – Danish virologist Preben von Magnus publishes his observation of the von Magnus phenomenon producing defective interfering particles.
 Biochemists Jack Gross and Rosalind Pitt-Rivers discover the thyroid hormone triiodothyronine.
 The Braeburn apple cultivar is discovered as a chance seedling in New Zealand.
 Last confirmed sighting of the Caribbean monk seal, at Serranilla Bank, between Jamaica and Nicaragua.

Chemistry
 Soviet scientists L. V. Radushkevich and V. M. Lukyanovich publish images of carbon nanotubes.

Computer science
 The first autocode and its compiler are developed by Alick Glennie for the Manchester Mark 1 computer, considered as the first working high-level compiled programming language.

History of science
 Discovery by Derek J. de Solla Price of a lost medieval scientific work entitled Equatorie of the Planetis, initially attributed to Geoffrey Chaucer.

Mathematics
 John Forbes Nash, Jr. produces groundbreaking work in the area of real algebraic geometry.
 The Bradley–Terry model in probability theory is presented.

Medicine
 February 6 – A mechanical heart is used for the first time in a human patient, in the United States.
 March 1 – The British Psychological Society is founded. 
 September 2 – The first successful operation to correct a cardiac shunt ("hole in the heart") is performed by Drs F. John Lewis and C. Walton Lillehei on a 5-year-old girl in the United States utilising the induced hypothermia technique developed by Wilfred Gordon "Bill" Bigelow.
 November – Royal College of General Practitioners established in the United Kingdom.
 November 20 – The first successful sex reassignment surgery is performed in Copenhagen, making George Jorgensen Jr. become Christine Jorgensen.
 December 14 – The first successful surgical separation of conjoined twins is conducted in Mount Sinai Hospital, Cleveland, Ohio.
 December – Robert Gwyn Macfarlane and colleagues publish the first identification of Haemophilia B.
 American obstetrical anesthesiologist Dr. Virginia Apgar devises the Apgar score as a simple replicable method of quickly and summarily assessing the health of babies immediately after childbirth.
 American orthopedic surgeon Armin Klein publishes Klein's line as a diagnostic tool.
 Jean Delay, head of psychiatry at Sainte-Anne Hospital, Paris, with Jean-François Buisson, reports the antidepressant effect of isoniazid.

Physics
 November 1 – Nuclear testing: Operation Ivy – The United States successfully detonates the first hydrogen device, codenamed "Ivy Mike" ["m" for megaton], at Eniwetok island in the Bikini Atoll located in the Pacific Ocean. The elements einsteinium and fermium are discovered in the fallout.
 Geoffrey Dummer proposes the integrated circuit.

Technology
 September 30 – The Cinerama widescreen film system, developed by Fred Waller, debuts with the movie This Is Cinerama at the Broadway Theatre in New York City.
 October 7 – The barcode is patented in the United States by Norman J. Woodland and Bernard Silver, though it does not make its first appearance in an American shop until 1974.

Awards
 Nobel Prizes
 Physics – Felix Bloch, Edward Mills Purcell
 Chemistry – Archer John Porter Martin, Richard Laurence Millington Synge
 Medicine – Selman Abraham Waksman

Births
 February 2 – Ralph Merkle, American computer scientist, co-inventor of public-key cryptography.
 February 15 – Frances Ashcroft, English geneticist.
 February 19 – Marcia McNutt, American geophysicist, science editor, and president of the National Academy of Sciences.
 February 28 – Simon P. Norton (died 2019), English mathematician, co-discoverer of 'monstrous moonshine'.
 March 24 – Reinhard Genzel, German astrophysicist, Nobel Prize in Physics, co-discovererer of black holes.
 July 15 – Ann Dowling, English mechanical engineer.
 August 14 – Peter Fonagy, Hungarian-born British psychoanalyst and clinical psychologist.
 August 25 – Charles M. Rice, American virologist, Nobel Prize in Physiology or Medicine, co-discovererer of the hepatitis C virus.
 Venki Ramakrishnan, Indian-born American-British structural biologist.

Deaths
 March 5 – Sir Charles Sherrington (born 1857), English neurophysiologist and bacteriologist, Nobel Prize in Physiology or Medicine 1932.
 June 17 – Jack Parsons (born 1914), American rocket engineer and occultist.
 September 5 – Hermann Stieve (born 1886), German anatomist and histologist.
 November 2 – Chaim Weizmann (born 1874), Belarusian-born chemist, first President of Israel.
 November 24 – André Rochon-Duvigneaud (born 1863), French ophthalmologist.
 December 4 – Karen Horney (born 1885), German American psychoanalyst.
 December 19 – Colonel Sir Charles Arden-Close (born 1865), British cartographer.

Notes

 
20th century in science
1950s in science